Make 'Em Laugh is an Irish comedy studio series hosted by Gay Byrne who had just retired from presenting The Late Late Show – which after The Tonight Show Starring Johnny Carson in the USA ended, became the longest-running live studio chat show on broadcast TV. The clip show aired for one series in 1999 and featured Byrne taking a look at some classic comedy moments from the RTÉ Archives. The idea was initially developed by EP John Masterson who brought in established comedy producer and writer Billy (Magra) McGrath to drive the content. Ironically Magra/McGrath had performed on The Late Late Show in 1981 as Ireland's 1st alternative comedian but the show was wiped. The title and the title music were derived from the song performed by Donald O’Connor in the classic Hollywood movie 'Singin' in the Rain'. In the year's Top 20 'most-watched Programmes of the Year poll Make "Em Laugh was at No.7 which amplified both the popularity of the series and also Gay Byrne's legendary box office appeal. This series spawned a plethora of similar TV ideas trawling the RTE Archives (e.g. Gaybo Laughs Back) with the latest copycat idea still airing in 2019 hosted by Pat Shortt. Late McGrath went on to become RTE's 1st ever Commissioning Editor of Entertainment (2000-2002) before emerging as one of Ireland's most successful format creators and, with his company Sideline Productions, Ireland's biggest radio comedy producer.

Will be online at RTE Player to celebrate 60 Years of television on New Year's Eve 2021.

References

1999 Irish television series debuts
1999 Irish television series endings
Irish comedy television shows
RTÉ original programming